The 2018 Long Beach State 49ers men's volleyball team represented Long Beach State University in the 2018 NCAA Division I & II men's volleyball season. The 49ers, led by fifteenth year head coach Alan Knipe, played their home games at Walter Pyramid. The 49ers competed as members of the Big West Conference, which was sponsoring men's volleyball for the first time, and were picked to win the Big West in the preseason poll. LBSU won the national championship, the second in program history.

Roster

Schedule
TV/Internet Streaming/Radio information:
22 West Media will carry select Long Beach State men's volleyball matches on the radio.
Big West TV will carry all home games and select conference road games. 

 *-Indicates conference match.
 Times listed are Pacific Time Zone.

Honors
All-Tournament Team: T.J. Defalco, Kyle Ensing, and Josh Tuaniga (also the Most Outstanding Player)

References

2018 in sports in California
2018 NCAA Division I & II men's volleyball season
2018 team
Long Beach State